Saint Gabriel's College is a private Catholic all-boys school in Bangkok, Thailand. The school was founded by the Brothers of Saint Gabriel in 1920.

The school educates students from grade 1 through grade 12 (K–12). Admission, especially in first grade, is highly competitive as only approximately 400 students per year are admitted. Total school enrollment is roughly 5,000 students. The school is known for its intensive English program.

History 

In 1918, after the First World War ended, the demand for schools and education in Bangkok sharply increased. At that time, the Brothers of Saint Gabriel had established only one school in Bangkok, Assumption College. As a response to increasing demand, Brother Martin de Tours proposed opening a new school in Bangkok. He accepted a plot of land offered by Father Brozat of the nearby Saint Francis Xavier Church in Samsen as the site for his vision.

Construction began in 1920, the chief engineer being Mr. Be'quelin. The main building was designed entirely by Brother Martin de Tours. The building, which cost approximately 100,000 Thai baht, was completed in February 1922. Due to the building being painted light red, it has since been referred to as "tuk-daeng" ('the red building').

In 1920, while construction was still taking place, Bro. Martin de Tours and his teaching staff began teaching temporarily at Mr. Berli's house. There were 141 students enrolled in the first year.

Symbol 
The symbol of Saint Gabriel's College is a coat of arms. The middle part is an escutcheon divided into four parts which are:
 A.M and white bouquet of tuberose: "A.M" means Ave Marie which means 'mother of Christ'. The white bouquet of tuberose represent a purity that all students of Saint Gabriel's aspire to.
 Boat and Polaris: the boat represents life's struggle. Polaris represents hope.
 DS and a cross: "DS" stands for Dieu Seul in French. The cross for the sacrifice of Jesus.
 The flower around the coat of arms is an ornament that reminds students to do good—for themselves and other.

Buildings
Saint Gabriel's College has 12 buildings and one stadium: 
 Martin De Tours buildings (ตึกมาร์ติน เดอ ตูร์) or Tuk-Daeng (ตึกแดง ตึกอำนวยการ)  was the first Saint Gabriel building, constructed in the age of Brother Martin De Tours. Tuk-Daeng since then has become the most significant emblem of the school. It can be seen first when entering the school. It was no longer used as a classroom for students, but it was used as the room of the chief manager and principal's office. Today, Tuk-Daeng is renovated and preserved as a memorial of the school.
 De Montfort buildings (ตึกเดอ มงฟอร์ต) is a four-storey building. On first and second floor are cafeterias for students, an auditorium and a library.
 John Mary buildings (ตึกจอห์น แมรี่) is a dormitory for foreign teachers and staffs. This building also houses the roof top John Mary Center for the Performing Arts which was funded and conceptualized by noted philanthropist Devin DiCristofaro and constructed by  architect John McLaughlin.
 Greg Gymnasium buildings (ตึกเกรก ยิมเนเซี่ยม)is a five-storey building which was constructed in 1971. It has a basketball court for primary 5 students
 Fatima buildings (ตึกฟาติมา รศ 200) is a seven-storey building which constructed in 1980.  It was the building for primary 1 and 2.
 Hubert buildings (ตึกฮิวเบิร์ต) Contains facilities such as a fitness center, swimming pool and car park.
 Andrew buildings (ตึกแอนดรู) is a six-storey building which was constructed in 2001. It was the building for secondary 1 and 2 students.
 Mae-Phra buildings (ตึกแม่พระ) is a six-storey building (including basement). It was constructed in 2007. Mae-Phra has a basketball court, swimming pool for secondary students, auditorium, and laboratory. It was the building for secondary 3–6 students.
 Annunciation buildings (ตึกแม่พระรับสาส์น) is the newest building of Saint Gabriel's College. It was constructed in 2012. It was the building for primary 3 and 4 students.
 90th Anniversary buildings (ตึก 90 ปี) is a five-storey building which was built for celebrating 90 years of Saint Gabriel's College.
 Martin De Tours Stadium (มาร์ติน เดอ ตูร์ สเตเดี้ยม) is the artificial turf football field with metal bleachers.

Directors

Notable alumni 
 M.R. Adulakit Kitiyakara (1930–2004), brother of Queen Sirikit, former President of the Supreme Court, former Privy Councillor
 Samak Sundaravej (1935–2009), former Prime Minister of Thailand
 Rapee Sagarik (1922–2018), Thai horticulturist, botanist and orchid expert
 Yuthasak Sasiprapha (born 1937), General, former minister of defence, former president of the National Olympic Committee of Thailand
 Teeradej Meepien (born 1938), General, former President of the Senate of Thailand
 Chirayu Isarangkun Na Ayuthaya (born 1943), former Lord Chamberlain of the Royal Household and former Director-General of the Crown Property Bureau
 Kosit Panpiemras (1943–2016), Executive Chairman of Bangkok Bank, former Minister of Industry and Deputy Prime Minister
 Surayud Chulanont (born 1943), General, former Commander-in-chief of the Royal Thai Army, former Prime Minister of Thailand
 Prawit Wongsuwan (born 1945), General, former Commander-in-chief of the Royal Thai Army, former Minister of Defence,  former Deputy Prime Minister
 Korn Dabbaransi (born 1945), former Deputy Prime Minister, former Minister of Science and Technology and Minister of Public Health
 Supachai Panitchpakdi (born 1946), former Director-General of the World Trade Organization (WTO), former Secretary-General of the UN Conference on Trade and Development (UNCTAD)
 M.R. Pridiyathorn Devakula (born 1947), former Governor of the Bank of Thailand, former Minister of Finance and Deputy Prime Minister
 Rewat Buddhinan (1948–1996), founder of the GMM Grammy
 Kobsak Sabhavasu (born 1949), former Deputy Prime Minister
 Thirachai Phuvanatnaranubala (born 1951), former Minister of Finance
 Itthaporn Subhawong (born 1952), former Commander-in-chief of the Royal Thai Air Force
 Udomdej Sitabutr (born 1955), former Commander-in-chief of the Royal Thai Army
 Suwat Liptapanlop (born 1955), former Deputy Prime Minister
 Pornchai Mongkhonvanit (born 1958), President of Siam University
 Apirat Kongsompong (born 1960), former Commander-in-chief of the Royal Thai Army
 Choengchai Chomchoengpaet (born 1963), incumbent Commander-in-chief of the Royal Thai Navy
 Varawut Silpa-archa (born 1973), former Minister of Natural Resources and Environment
 Aiyawatt Srivaddhanaprabha (born 1985), CEO of King Power
 Sanon Wangsrangboon (born 1989), Deputy Governor of Bangkok
 Timethai (born 1996), Actor and singer
 Billkin Putthipong Assaratanakul (born 1999), Actor and singer
 Fourth Nattawat Jirochtikul (born 2004), Actor and singer

References

Catholic schools in Thailand
Boys' schools in Thailand
Schools in Bangkok
Educational institutions established in 1920
1920 establishments in Siam
Brothers of Christian Instruction of St Gabriel schools
Dusit district